Chah Mish (also Romanized as Chāh Mīsh) is a village in Kuhestan Rural District, Rostaq District, Darab County, Fars Province, Iran. At the 2006 census, its population was 22, in 8 families.

References 

Populated places in Darab County